Harry Ball may refer to:

Harry Ball (figure skater) in Canadian Figure Skating Championships
Harry Ball, character in After the Ball

See also
Henry Ball (disambiguation)
Harold Ball (1920–1942), Australian rules footballer